Events in the year 1942 in Turkey.

Parliament
 6th Parliament of Turkey

Incumbents
President – İsmet İnönü 
Prime Minister 
Refik Saydam (up to 7 July)
Ahmet Fikri Tüzer (acting, 7 July – 9 July)
Şükrü Saracoğlu (from 9 July)

Ruling party and the main opposition
  Ruling party – Republican People's Party (CHP)

Cabinet
12th government of Turkey (up to 9 July)
13th government of Turkey (from 9 July)

Events
16 March – British war planes bombarded Milas. They claimed this event as an error.
8 April – Exchange of wounded British and Italian soldiers in İzmir
7 July – Upon Refik Saydam’s death on duty, Ahmet Fikri Tüzer acted as the prime minister for two days
14 July – Atılay tragedy.  Submarine Atılay sank because of a naval mine in the Strait of Çanakkale (Dardanelles)
11 November – Wealth tax (varlık vergisi) an incontestable tax to support the treasury against World War II expenditures
20 December – 1942 Niksar–Erbaa earthquake

Births
1 January – Vural Öger, businessman
14 March – Emin Çölaşan, journalist
31 May – Gündüz Tekin Onay, footballer and coach
12 June – Tülay Tuğcu, chief judge
17 June – Doğu Perinçek, politician
2 July – Ahmet Türk, politician
9 August – Erman Şener, film critic, screenwriter
22 August, Uğur Mumcu, academic, journalist
30 August, Zafer Ergin, actor
18 September – Şenes Erzik, vice president of the Union of European Football Associations (UEFA)
13 October – Aykut Oray, actor
23 December -Süha Arın, film director

Deaths
7 July – Refik Saydam (born in 1881), prime minister on duty
9 May – Vedat Tek (born in 1873), architect 
16 August – Ahmet Fikri Tüzer (born in 1878), government minister and former acting prime minister
8 September – Rıza Nur (born in 1879),  politician
16 November – Ömer Lütfi Argeşo (born in 1880), politician

Gallery

References

 
Years of the 20th century in Turkey
Turkey
Turkey
Turkey